No Creek is a stream in Livingston and Grundy counties of northern Missouri in the United States. It is a tributary of the Thompson River.

The origin of the name No Creek is obscure.

See also
List of rivers of Missouri

References

Rivers of Livingston County, Missouri
Rivers of Grundy County, Missouri
Rivers of Missouri